Dunkerton may refer to:

Places
Dunkerton, Iowa, United States
Dunkerton, Somerset, England

Other uses
Dunkerton (surname), a surname